Polarity in international relations is any of the various ways in which power is distributed within the international system. It describes the nature of the international system at any given period of time. One generally distinguishes three types of systems: unipolarity, bipolarity, and multipolarity for three or more centers of power. The type of system is completely dependent on the distribution of power and influence of states in a region or globally.

Scholars differ as to whether bipolarity or unipolarity is likely to produce the most stable and peaceful outcomes. Kenneth Waltz and John Mearsheimer are among those who argue that bipolarity tends to generate relatively more stability, whereas John Ikenberry and William Wohlforth are among those arguing for the stabilizing impact of unipolarity. Some scholars, such as Karl Deutsch and J. David Singer, argued that multipolarity was the most stable structure.

Unipolarity
Unipolarity is a condition in which one state under the condition of international anarchy enjoys a preponderance of power and faces no competitor states. A unipolar state is not the same as an empire or a hegemon that can control the behavior of all other states.

Scholars have debated the durability and peacefulness of unipolarity. William Wohlforth argues that unipolarity is durable and peaceful because it reduces the likelihood of hegemonic rivalry (because no state is powerful enough to challenge the unipole) and it reduces the salience and stakes of balance of power politics among the major states, thus reducing the likelihood that attempts at balances of power cause major war. Wohlforth builds his argument on hegemonic stability theory and a rejection of the balance of power theory. With no great power to check its adventurism, the United States will weaken itself by misusing its power internationally. “Wide latitude” of “policy choices” will allow the U.S. to act capriciously on the basis of “internal political pressure and national ambition.”

According to Carla Norrlöf, U.S. unipolarity is stable and sustainable due to a combination of three factors: 1. The status of the American dollar as the world's dominant reserve currency, 2. American commercial power, and 3. American military preponderance. The United States benefits disproportionately from its status as hegemon. Other states do not challenge U.S. hegemony because many of them benefit from the U.S.-led order, and there are significant coordination problems in creating an alternative world order.

Nuno P. Monteiro argues that unipolarity is conflict-prone, both between the unipole and other states, and exclusively among other states. Monteiro substantiates this by remarking that “the United States has been at war for thirteen of the twenty-two years since the end of the Cold War. Put another way, the first two decades of unipolarity, which make up less than 10 percent of U.S. history, account for more than 25 percent of the nation’s total time at war.” Kenneth Waltz that unipolarity is “the least durable of international configurations.” Secondly, even if the United States acts benevolently, states will still attempt to balance against it because the power asymmetry demands it: In a self-help system, states do not worry about other states’ intentions as they do other states' capabilities. “Unbalanced power leaves weaker states feeling uneasy and gives them reason to strengthen their positions,” Waltz says.

In a 2009 study, Martha Finnemore argues that unipolarity has, contrary to some expectations, not given the United States a free rein to do what it wants and that unipolarity has proven to be quite frustrating for the United States. The reasons for this is that unipolarity does not just entail a material superiority by the unipole, but also a social structure whereby the unipole maintains its status through legitimation, and institutionalization. In trying to obtain legitimacy from the other actors in the international system, the unipole necessarily gives those actors a degree of power. The unipole also obtains legitimacy and wards off challenges to its power through the creation of institutions, but these institutions also entail a diffusion of power away from the unipole.

In a 2021 study, Yuan-kang Wang argues from the experience of Ming China (1368–1644) and Qing China (1644–1912) that the durability of unipolarity is contingent on the ability of the unipole to sustain its power advantage and for potential challengers to increase their power without provoking a military reaction from the unipole.

American primacy 
Numerous thinkers predicted U.S primacy in the 20th century onwards, including William Gladstone, Michel Chevalier, K'ang Yu-wei, Georges Vacher de Lapouge, H. G. Wells in Anticipations (1900), and  William Thomas Stead.

Liberal institutionalist John Ikenberry argues in a series of influential writings that the United States purposely set up an international order after the end of World War that sustained US primacy. In his view, realist predictions of power balancing did not bear fruit because the United States engaged in strategic restraint after World War II, thereby convincing weaker states that it was more interested in cooperation rather than domination. U.S. strategic restraint allowed weaker countries to participate in the make-up of the post-war world order, which limited opportunities for the United States to exploit total power advantages. Ikenberry notes that while the United States could have unilaterally engaged in unfettered power projection, it decided instead to “lock in” its advantage long after zenith by establishing an enduring institutional order, gave weaker countries a voice, reduced great power uncertainty, and mitigated the security dilemma. The liberal basis of U.S. hegemony—a transparent democratic political system—has made it easier for other countries to accept the post-war order, Ikenberry explains. “American hegemony is reluctant, open, and highly institutionalized—or in a word, liberal” and “short of large-scale war or a global economic crisis, the American hegemonic order appears to be immune to would-be hegemonic challengers.”

Michael Beckley argues American primacy is vastly underestimated because power indices frequently fail to take into account GDP per capita in the U.S. relative to other purportedly powerful states, such as China and India.

In 2011, Barry Posen argued that unipolarity was in wane and that the world was shifting towards multipolarity. In 2019, John Mearsheimer argued that the international system was shifting from unipolarity to multipolarity.

In 2022, William Wohlforth argued that the international system was heading towards a system that can be characterized neither as bipolarity nor multipolarity. He added that polarity did not appear to matter as much in the current international system, as great powers command a far smaller share of power vis-a-vis the rest of the states in the international system.

Bipolarity 

Bipolarity is a distribution of power in which two states have a preponderance of power. In bipolarity, spheres of influence and alliance systems have frequently developed around each pole. For example, in the Cold War of 1947-1991, most Western and capitalist states would fall under the influence of the US, while most Communist states would fall under the influence of the USSR. Kenneth Waltz's influential Theory of International Politics argued that bipolarity tended towards the greatest stability because the two great powers would engage in rapid mutual adjustment, which would prevent inadvertent escalation and reduce the chance of power asymmetries forming. Dale Copeland has challenged Waltz on this, arguing that bipolarity creates a risk for war when a power asymmetry or divergence happens.

Historic examples of bipolarity include Great Britain and France in 18th century from the end of the War of the Spanish Succession (1701-1715) until the Seven Years' War (1754-1763), and the United States and the Soviet Union during the Cold War (1947-1991).

According to Sullivan and Donnelly, a "polycentric" period emerged between 1963 and 1988 - in contrast to the bipolar period of 1945 to 1962.

 De Tocqueville foreshadowed in 1830 a great-power bipolarity similar to that of the Cold War.

Multipolarity 
Multipolarity is a distribution of power in which more than two nation-states have nearly equal amounts of power. The Concert of Europe, a period from after the Napoleonic Wars to the Crimean War, was an example of peaceful multipolarity (the great powers of Europe assembled regularly to discuss international and domestic issues), as was the Interwar period. Examples of wartime multipolarity include World War I, World War II, the Thirty Years War, the Warring States period, the Three Kingdoms period and the tripartite division between Song dynasty/Liao dynasty/Jin dynasty/Yuan dynasty..

Classical realist theorists, such as Hans Morgenthau and E. H. Carr, hold that multipolar systems are more stable than bipolar systems, as great powers can gain power through alliances and petty wars that do not directly challenge other powers; in bipolar systems, classical realists argue, this is not possible.

Neorealist hold that multipolar systems are particularly unstable and conflict-prone, as there is greater complexity in managing alliance systems, and a greater chance of misjudging the intentions of other states. Thomas Christensen and Jack Snyder argue that multipolarity tends towards instability and conflict escalation due to "chain-ganging" (allies get drawn into unwise wars provoked by alliance partners) and "buck-passing" (states which do not experience an immediate proximate threat do not balance against the threatening power in the hope that others carry the cost of balancing against the threat).

Multipolarity does not guarantee multilateralism and can pose a challenge against multilateralism. According to Kemal Derviş, a decline in unipolarity creates a crisis in multilateralism; it is possible to revive multilateralism in a multipolar system, but this is more threatened and the structure to do so is not fully developed. In multipolarity, larger powers can negotiate "mega-regional" agreements more easily than smaller ones. When there are multiple competing great powers, this can lead to the smaller states being left out of such agreements. Though multipolar orders form regional hegemonies around 'poles' or great powers, this can weaken economic interdependencies within regions, at least in regions without a great power. Additionally, as multipolar systems can tend to regional hegemonies or bounded orders, agreements are formed within these bounded orders rather than globally. Though, Mearsheimer predicts the persistence of a thin international order within multipolarity, which constitutes some multilateral agreements.

Measuring the power concentration 
The Correlates of War uses a systemic concentration of power formula to calculate the polarity of a given great power system. The formula was developed by J. David Singer et al. in 1972.

 

t = the time at which the concentration of resources (i.e. power) is being calculated
i = the state of which the proportion of control over the system's power is being measured
Nt = the number of states in the great power system at time t
S = the proportion of power possessed. Hence, Sit = the proportion of power possessed by state i at time t.

The expression  represents the sum of the squares of the proportion of power possessed by all states in the great power system.

The closer the resulting concentration is to zero, the more evenly divided power is. The closer to 1, the more concentrated power is. There is a general but not strict correlation between concentration and polarity. It is rare to find a result over 0.5, but a result between 0.4 and 0.5 usually indicates a unipolar system, while a result between 0.2 and 0.4 usually indicated a bipolar or multipolar system. Concentration can be plotted over time, so that the fluctuations and trends in concentration can be observed.

See also 
 Balance of power (international relations)
 Global policeman
 International monetary systems
 Non-Aligned Movement
 Pax Americana
 Pax Britannica
 Power (international relations)
 Posthegemony
 Regional hegemony
 Thucydides Trap

Bibliography
 Thompson, William R. On Global War: Historical–Structural Approaches to World Politics. Columbia, SC: University of South Carolina Press, 1988, pp. 209–210.

Notes

References

External links
Global Power Barometer

International relations theory